Polyscope may refer to:

Selig Polyscope Company, early American motion picture company
Polyscope Media Group, a TV program/film production company
Le Polyscope, a student newspaper of École Polytechnique de Montréal, Canada
Polyscope film sound system
Polyscope Polymers, a major producer of the SMA polymer